Ultracity is a Swedish dance music duo, consisting of Yourhighness and Elias Raam. They also run Rollerboys Recordings with Måns Ericson. Elias Raam is also a part of duo Arken, released on Sonar Kollektiv.

Discography
Discography from Discogs

Releases
 Swetalic EP (Rollerboys Recordings, 2007)
 Klee (Epic Disco Vol. 1) (Rollerboys Recordings, 2009)

Remixes
 Pallers "Humdrum" (Humdrum EP) (Labrador, 2008)
 Jens Lekman "Sipping on the Sweet Nectar" (Service/Rollerboys Recordings, 2008)
 Bogdan Irkük a.k.a. BULGARI "Jewel of the Black Sea" (The Coastal EP) (Rollerboys Recordings, 2008)

Compilations
 Second Royal Vol.4 "Klee" (Second Royal, 2008)

References

External links 
 Ultracity on Myspace
 

Swedish electronic music groups
Living people
Year of birth missing (living people)